Dave Brown was a pioneer of rugby league football in Australia.

He played in the opening 2 seasons of the new sport for Eastern Suburbs, 1908 and 1909.

A centre, Brown made 14 appearances for the East's club during the 1908 and 1909 seasons, including the NSWRL's first match and first premiership decider. He played one match in 1910 before retiring.

In the 1909, season Brown represented Australia in a match against a touring New Zealand Māori side that season Brown also appeared in several non-sanctioned matches between a rugby league's side known as the 'Kangaroos' and a rugby union side known as 'Wallabies'.

Like so many rugby league players of that time Brown was a rugby union footballer, in 1907 he took part in the rebel series against the New Zealand 'All Golds' that helped to launch rugby league in Australia. In its appreciation, the NSWRL awarded Brown life membership in 1914.

David Brown is recognised as the Eastern Suburbs club's 3rd player.

References

E E Christensen's Yearbooks
The Encyclopedia of Rugby League Players

Australian rugby union players
Australian rugby league players
Sydney Roosters players
Australia national rugby league team players
Rugby league centres
Year of birth missing
Year of death missing